Grand Pass can refer to any of the following:

Grand Pass, Missouri, a town in Missouri
Grand Pass (Washington), a mountain pass in Washington